Sde Warburg is a moshav shitufi in central Israel. Located to the north of Kfar Saba, it falls under the jurisdiction of Drom HaSharon Regional Council.

History
Before the 20th century the area formed part of the Forest of Sharon. It was an open woodland dominated by Mount Tabor Oak, which extended from Kfar Yona in the north to Ra'anana in the south. The local Arab inhabitants traditionally used the area for pasture, firewood and intermittent cultivation. The intensification of settlement and agriculture in the coastal plain during the 19th century led to deforestation and subsequent environmental degradation.

The moshav was established in 1938 as a Tower and Stockade settlement by immigrants from Germany and was named after Botanist and Zionist leader Otto Warburg.

World record

Sde Warburg held the Guinness World Record for the largest lettuce salad, weighing 10,260 kg. The event, held on 10 November 2007, was part of the 70th anniversary celebration of the founding of the moshav. The salad was sold to participants and onlookers alike for 10 NIS per bowl, raising 100,000 NIS (over $25,000) to benefit Aleh Negev, a rehabilitative village for young adults suffering from severe physical and cognitive disabilities.

References

External links
Official website

Moshavim
Populated places in Central District (Israel)
Populated places established in 1938
1938 establishments in Mandatory Palestine
German-Jewish culture in Israel